The discography of Julia Stone, an Australian folk singer-songwriter, consists of four studio albums, two EPs and twenty singles (including five as featured artist).

Stone also performs with her brother Angus as the duo, Angus & Julia Stone.

Albums

Studio albums

Notes

Extended plays

Singles

As lead artist

As featured artist

See also
 Angus and Julia Stone

References

Discographies of Australian artists
Folk music discographies